The Amazing World of Gumball characters appear in the British-American animated sitcom The Amazing World of Gumball. The series revolves around the daily life of 12-year-old cat Gumball Watterson and his family—adoptive brother Darwin, sister Anais, and parents Nicole (née Senicourt) and Richard. Other Elmore Junior High students also have recurring roles. Creator Ben Bocquelet conceived The Amazing World of Gumball in 2007 while working for Cartoon Network Development Studio Europe, and based several of its characters on previous characters he had created for commercials.

Main characters

Notes
Episodes are dictated by title as the series order is not consistent with the production order, original airing order, or order on streaming services like HBO Max.

Gumball Watterson

Gumball Tristopher "Trisha" Watterson born Zach Watterson, is the protagonist. He is a 12-year-old mischievous blue cat who lives with his family. He attends middle school. In "The Club", his middle name was supposed to be Christopher, but it was actually Tristopher or Trisha for short. In "The Name", he changed his name into Zach and later changed it back into Gumball.

Gumball was initially presented as well-meaning, but naive. Later, he was shown as more serious, capable of logical thinking, and prone to sarcasm. Despite occasional lapses in judgment, Gumball is loyal, straightforward, and good-natured. He is protective of his loved ones but has a large ego, often causing him to overreact.

Darwin Watterson

Darwin Raglan Caspian Ahab Poseidon Nicodemius Watterson, III is a 10-year-old orange goldfish who was adopted by the Watterson family. Initially given to Gumball as a pet, Darwin later sprouted legs and became a full family member. His arc begins with him as a naif, then shows him maturing. Darwin is loyal to Gumball and helps him out. He is sometimes shown exhibiting strange behavior, such as calling his adoptive parents Mr Dad and Mrs Mom. In "The Party", it is revealed that this is Darwin's full name.

Anais Watterson

Anais Errrrrr Watterson, a pink rabbit, is Gumball's precocious 4-year-old sister. She is one grade above her brothers. She is always telling Gumball what to do. She often impatiently tags along with him as a voice of reason. She has, however, been shown manipulating her family to get what she wants. She sometimes exhibits childlike behavior. Anais is shown as socially-inept and incapable of forming friendships as she drives potential friends away with over-the-top clinginess.

Nicole Watterson

Doctor Nicole Watterson (née Senicourt) (voiced by Teresa Gallagher) is a 38-year-old cat and the mother of Gumball, Darwin, and Anais. She is a bossy, over-stressed, hot-tempered workaholic, who can be sweet. Nicole is a master martial artist, knowing Karate and winning numerous tournaments when she was young. She shows affection for and is protective of her family. Nicole is occasionally vindictive, while also resourceful and inventive. In "The Parents", it is revealed that Doctor is her first name and Nicole is her middle name.

Richard Watterson

Richard Buckley Watterson is a 38-year-old anthropomorphic pink rabbit. He is the father of Gumball, Darwin and Anais. A stay-at-home dad, he spends most of his time sleeping, watching TV, and playing video games. Richard sometimes dresses as a woman, calling himself Samantha. He is "the laziest person in Elmore". He has a large appetite and is a voracious eater. Richard often serves as a third wheel to his sons' misadventures and cares deeply for his family despite his lethargy. He is naive and frequently gets called "dumb".

Richard is shown exhibiting childish behavior. He believes in ghosts and Santa Claus. He enjoys pulling pranks and laughing at people, but hates it when others prank or laugh at him.

Recurring characters

Elmore Junior High students

Penny Fitzgerald
Penny Fitzgerald (voiced by Teresa Gallagher) is a shape-shifting fairy (formerly a peanut with antlers) and classmate of Gumball who belatedly becomes his girlfriend. Like Gumball, she has trouble expressing her feelings. Underneath Penny's shell lies a yellow, fairy-like self that shape-shifts based on her emotional state. She is a member of the Elmore Junior High cheerleading and synchronized swimming teams.

Rob
Rob (voiced by Charles Philipp, David Warner, and Hugo Harrison) is a tall cyclops and Elmore Junior High student who becomes Gumball's arch-enemy.

Carrie Krueger
Carrie Krueger (voiced by Jessica McDonald) is a ghost who lives in a malevolent mansion and "enjoys being depressed". She can teleport and possess living bodies. She is the daughter of a man who formed a romantic relationship with a female ghost. She and Darwin become a couple. Carrie's last name is a reference to Freddy Krueger from the A Nightmare on Elm Street franchise.

Tobias Wilson
Tobias Wilson (voiced by Rupert Degas, season 1; Hugo Harrison, season 2 onward) is a multicolored, cloud-shaped humanoid who is interested in sports and possesses an overbearing self-confidence. He thinks of himself as a heavily built jock, despite actually being rather weak, and appears to be wealthy. He debuts in "The Third", where he demands twenty dollars to be Gumball and Darwin's friend.

Banana Joe
Joseph "Banana Joe" A. Banana (voiced by Mic Graves) is a hyperactive banana and the class clown, who cracks a joke whenever possible. He can be a bully, usually to Gumball and Darwin.

Masami Yoshida 
Masami Yoshida (voiced by Jessica McDonald) is a cloud who is the wealthy daughter of the Rainbow Factory's owner. She is spoiled, tantrum-prone and vindictive. When angry, she can develop into a storm cloud capable of causing massive damage.

Bobert
Bobert (voiced by Kerry Shale) is a robot who is one of the smartest students, but constantly struggles to understand emotion and develop a social life. He can transform into a larger form by triggering his "defense mode".

Sarah G. Lato
Sara G. Lato (voiced by Jessica McDonald) is a yellow ice cream cone and student. She is depicted as an obsessive fan of Gumball and Darwin.

Leslie
Leslie (voiced by Kerry Shale) is an effeminate, friendly daisy who plays flute in the school band and can often be found hanging around the girls. He is Penny's cousin.

Alan Keane
Alan Keane (voiced by Kerry Shale, season 1; Hugo Harrison, season 2 onward) is a teal-colored balloon who is Carmen's boyfriend. He is overly nice and even-tempered. Being filled with helium, Alan regularly speaks in a high-pitched voice. In "The Photo", Gumball envies him for having a beautiful face. Alan rebuffs this, but Gumball replies: "Dude, even your mole looks better than me". In "The Vision" it is revealed Alan secretly plans to take over the world and rule it as a dictator, brainwashing people to eradicate sadness. After discovering this, Gumball and Darwin attempt to assassinate Alan, which they succeed in after many failed attempts – though he reappears in subsequent episodes without any explanation. It was shown in "The Faith" that the world goes through chaos if Alan stops his kindness.

Carmen
Carmen (voiced by Teresa Gallagher, season 1; Alix Wilton Regan, season 2 onward) is a cactus who is considered to be a leader. She is Alan's girlfriend.Carmen is a cheerleader. She is best friends with Penny, Sarah, and Molly.

Teri
Teri (voiced by Teresa Gallagher) is a hypochondriac paper bear usually found in the nurse's office. Although somewhat self-absorbed and paranoid, she is very nice and is a cheerleader.

Hector Jötunheim
Hector Jötunheim (voiced by Kerry Shale) is a gentle Bigfoot-like giant. He is the largest student in Elmore Junior High, so that only his legs and feet are seen on-screen. He can be dangerous if he expresses too much emotion, such as anger, sadness or excitement. His surname is a reference to Jötunheimr, the homeland of giants in Norse mythology.

Tina Rex
Tina Rex (voiced by Dan Russell, season 1; Stefan Ashton Frank, season 2 onward) is a Tyrannosaurus who lives in the city junkyard, and a notorious bully. She often picks on her fellow schoolmates, especially Gumball, and has her own gang of bullies which includes Jamie and Anton. She is one of the strongest and most aggressive students. Her Cartoon Network biography suggests that she might have animosity toward others because she is "angry at the world for not noticing her femininity".

Idaho
Idaho (voiced by Kerry Shale, season 1; Hugo Harrison, season 2 onward) is a free-spirited potato from the countryside with conservative beliefs. He is one of the less popular students.

Anton
Anton (voiced by Lewis MacLeod in "The Dress" and Tony Hull in every other appearance) is a piece of toast who is forcibly drafted into Tina's gang, hoping that by appeasing her he will avoid her anger. He is prone to getting killed in various freak accidents, only to be resurrected by his parents with a toaster that creates a new slice of him.

Juke
Juke (voiced by Hugo Harrison, music by Beatbox Hobbit) is a native of Boomboxemburg with a boombox for a head and he moves to Elmore. He speaks entirely in beatboxing. As a result, nobody can understand him. He is able to speak English if he is switched from "Music Mode" to "Voice Mode" through a switch on the back of his head, as seen in "The Boombox", but his arms are too short to reach it and his attempts to communicate this fact to others fail.

Sussie
Sussie (face by Aurelie Charbonnier, voiced by Fergus Craig season 1 to season 4, voiced by Aurelie Charbonnier season 5, Ben Bocquelet voiced her screaming, yelling, and laughing Season 2 onward) is an upside-down chin with googly eyes and puppet-like characteristics. She is talkative, odd, and obnoxious, and as a result, is generally avoided by her classmates.

Clayton
Clayton (voiced by Rupert Degas in "The Party", Kwesi Boakye in "The Dress"; Max Cazier, season 2 onward) is a red ball of clay who can shapeshift into anything and is a compulsive liar with a tendency to make up absurd stories.

Rachel Wilson
Rachel Wilson (voiced by Jessica McDonald) is Tobias' older sister, who is disgusted by Tobias and his "dweeb loser baby friends". The directing staff did not like the character, so Rachel was dropped during the second season.

Ocho
Harry "Ocho" Tootmorsel (voiced by Max Cazier) is a spider and a generally friendly person, but often overreacts to what people say about. He originally spoke solely in video game blips; later began speaking in comprehensible, albeit distorted, sentences.

The Eggheads
Colin and Felix (voiced by Kerry Shale for Colin and Rupert Degas in season 1 and Hugo Harrison in season 2 onward for Felix) are a pair of egg brothers who are two of the most intelligent students. They speak with English accents and consider themselves to be much smarter than their classmates.

Jamie Russo
Jamie Russo (voiced by Jessica McDonald, seasons 1–2; Maria Teresa Creasey, season 3 onward) is a "half-cow, half-troglodyte" creature who is one of Tina's bullies. As a result of Ms. Simian holding her back a year, she is resentful of her classmates and of authority in general. Her mother is the gym coach, whom she listens to despite her mother's disapproval of bullying.

William
William (internal monologue narrated by Mic Graves) is a flying eyeball who is Ms. Simian's personal spy and only talks when reporting information to her. He has psychic abilities.

Molly Collins
Molly Collins (voiced by Jessica McDonald) is a shy sauropod. She is a cheerleader and, as shown in "The Pressure", the owner of a treehouse where she and the other girls hang out. She made several appearances in the show's first season, but was absent for the second season until she is rescued from the Void.

Hot Dog Guy
Hot Dog Guy (voiced by Alex Jordan) is a hotdog who is awkward with Gumball.

Clare Cooper
Clare Cooper (voiced by Naomi McDonald) is an emo girl who is a pinkish-grey-skinned humanoid. She hates Gumball and Darwin but is friends with Penny and Anais.

Julius Oppenheimer Jr.
Julius Oppenheimer Jr. (voiced by Hugo Harrison) is a bomb-headed humanoid styled after a 1920s cartoon character. He has anger issues and his head explodes when he feels disgusted or angry. Julius is a bully; he often appears in detention or with his gang. His parents are a stick of dynamite named Julius Oppenheimer Sr. and a firework rocket, who also have a 1920s rubber hose style. Julius's name is a reference to J. Robert Oppenheimer, the "father of the atomic bomb".

Elmore Junior High staff

Principal Brown
Principal Nigel Brown (voiced by Lewis MacLeod, season 1; Steve Furst, season 2 onward) is a furry slug who is Elmore Junior High's illegal principal and Ms Simian's love interest. He didn't get a legal document for being the principal.He likes to lick Ms Simian's hair and sing while she holds him. He teaches music, judges cheerleader tryouts, leads the school's band, and is a substitute sports teacher. Along with Mr. Small and Ms. Simian, he used to teach gym until replaced by Coach Russo. His Cartoon Network biography states that his romance with Ms. Simian was detrimental to his profession, leaving him unable to properly run Elmore Junior High. He has a face on the back of his head similar to that of Quirinus Quirell and Lord Voldemort from Harry Potter.

Ms. Simian
Lucy Simian (voiced by Lewis MacLeod, season 1; Hugo Harrison, season 2 onward) is a 2 million year old baboon, the sadistic teacher of Gumball and Darwin's class as well as a major antagonist. She takes pleasure in giving her students pop quizzes. She is generally unpleasant,hates children especially Gumball
, and is hated by the entire student body. Principal Brown is her love interest. She has a generally antagonistic relationship with Gumball. Her face intentionally resembles that of the Grim Reaper.

Mr. Small
Steve Small (voiced by Lewis MacLeod, season 1; Adam Long, season 2 onward) is the Elmore Junior High guidance counselor, a cloud man who is interested in New Age culture and possesses hippie-like appearance and behavior. Mr. Small's unconventional teaching methods are usually more confusing than helpful, and they often leave his office confused. It is revealed in the episode "The Fraud" that he is not a U.S. citizen, though it is unclear if he was merely born elsewhere or renounced his citizenship. He lost his love Janice, which in the episode "The Void" is revealed to be a purple van that runs on "good vibes". His mannerisms are similar to those of Mr Van Driessen from Beavis and Butt-head.

Rockwell "Rocky" Robinson
Rockwell "Rocky" Robinson (voiced by Lewis MacLeod in season 1, Hugo Harold-Harrison in season 2, and Simon Lipkin in seasons 3 onward) is an orange, fuzzy Muppet-like character who performs odd jobs, mostly as janitor, cafeteria worker, school bus driver, and, in "The Curse", the clerk at the lost and found office. He is the son of Mr. and Mrs. Robinson, the Wattersons' next-door neighbours, and is generally good-natured and gets along with the children well.

Coach Russo
Coach Russo (voiced by Dan Russell) is a large, pink 3-dimensional cube who is Jamie's mother. The newest member of the faculty, she works to ensure that all of the students are fit like her daughter. She makes her debut appearance in "The Coach" and speaks in a consistent deadpan.

Mr. Corneille
Moonchild Corneille (voiced by Simon Lipkin) is a frog and the 8th-grade teacher of geography. He pretends to be sophisticated but has a fake personality. As of "The Cage", he is in a relationship with Joan Markham, the school nurse. His picture is on all of his history books.

Joan Markham
Joan Markham (voiced by Teresa Gallagher) is the school nurse. She is in a relationship with Mr Corneille, starting in "The Cage". She hates her job. She does not know how to help the students because most of them have biologies she has no clue how to work with. She is always sarcastic because of this and tries to do the least work possible to help her students. She is also a paramedic, doctor, and nurse at a hospital, even though she hates her job. She has long blonde hair under her hat.

Other Watterson family members

Frankie Watterson
Frankie Watterson (voiced by Richard "Rich" Fulcher) is a rat who is a conman. He is the ex-husband of Granny Jojo and the father of Richard who abandoned them.

Joanna Watterson
Granny Jojo (voiced by Sandra Dickinson) is the Watterson children's grandmother and also Richard's mother. She is a pink rabbit who speaks in a New York accent. She was previously married to Frankie, who abandoned her and a young Richard under the pretence of going out to buy milk; She later marries Louie.

Louie Watterson
Louie Watterson (voiced by Shane Rimmer) is a black mouse and a former member of a crew of Elmore senior citizens that includes Betty, Donald, and Marvin Finkleheimer. Now he is Granny Jojo's step-husband.

Other characters

Mr. and Mrs. Robinson
Gaylord and Margaret Robinson (Gaylord voiced by Rupert Degas in season 1, Stefan Ashton Frank in season 2 onward, and Margaret voiced by Teresa Gallagher) are the Wattersons' stuck-up, grouchy, next-door neighbors, and Rocky's parents. They are grey Muppet-like characters and hate their neighbors with a passion. Mrs. Robinson is pure evil and enjoys causing suffering. Their constant bickering is a focal point of their relationship, and they actually enjoy doing so. Mr. Robinson owns a prized 1970 Cadillac Coupe de Ville Convertible.

Banana Barbara
Banana Barbara (voiced by Sandra Searles Dickinson, Naomi McDonald) is a recurring character and the mother of Banana Joe. She is best known for being able to predict the future in her art.

Harold Wilson
Harold Wilson (voiced by Kerry Shale) is the father of Tobias Wilson and works as a psychotherapist. He has been making fun of Richard Watterson ever since playing a prank on him in high school, as seen in "The Cycle".

Garry Hedges
Garry Hedges or Harry Gedges (voiced by Dan Russell) is a neighbor of the Wattersons who lives on the left side. He is a purple moose with large antlers and works as a mailman. He is commonly seen wearing a pale brown hat, green sweater with blue slacks. In "The Neighbor", it is revealed that his real name is meant to be secret and his pseudonym is Harry Gedges by which Gumball and Darwin didn't know him.

Larry Needlemeyer
Larry Needlemeyer (voiced by Kerry Shale) is an origami rock, who works at almost every establishment in Elmore, including the grocery store, the gas station, convenience store, several fast-food restaurants and the DVD rental shop. He was previously been known as "Lazy Larry", the laziest person in Elmore until he lost his title to Richard and morphed into a hard worker. Larry was generally distrusting of the Wattersons, as they often get him into trouble. He has a girlfriend named Karen.

Patrick Fitzgerald
Patrick Fitzgerald (voiced by Dan Russell) is Penny's father.

Judith Fitzgerald
Judith Fitzgerald (voiced by Maria Teresa Creasey) is the mother of Penny and Polly and is married to Patrick Fitzgerald.

Marvin Finkleheimer
Marvin Finkleheimer (voiced by Dan Russell) is a red bean who lives at a house and likes to beat kids with his cane if they help him across the street. He was originally going to be named Bert, and he is called that by the yellow old man, Donald, and Louie but that was changed/retconned by the writers.

Doughnut Sheriff
Doughnut Sheriff (voiced by Lewis MacLeod in season 1, and Dan Russell in season 2 onwards) is a pink-frosted doughnut who, as his name suggests, is an officer in Elmore's police force. His voice and personality is based on that of Chief Wiggum from The Simpsons

Sal Left Thumb
Sal Left Thumb (voiced by Kerry Shale) is one of Elmore's most wanted criminals, a fingerprint whose weapon of choice is a rusty spoon, as seen in "The Spoon".

Felicity and Billy Parham
Felicity Parham (voiced by Sandra Searles Dickinson, and Teresa Gallagher in "The Kids") is an orange blob on the show along with her son William Geoffrey "Billy" Fitzgerald Kitchener Parham, III, who is a blue blob. Billy appears to be an intelligent boy who asks his mother random questions about life. He speaks with a sarcastic deep British voice.

Mr. Rex
Mr. Rex is Tina Rex's father. He loves to eat invaders at home.

Mowdown
Phillip "Mowdown" (voiced by Simon Lipkin) is a violent giant pink teddy bear who wears a shirt with a heart on it. Mowdown is one of the more violent members of Julius' crew.

Kenneth
Kenneth is a greyish-brown monstrous blob creature created by Gumball mixing disgusting things into a jar in "The Microwave" and Richard accidentally microwaving it.

Carlton and Troy
Carlton and Troy (Carton is voiced by Hugo Harrison and Troy is voiced by Fergus Craig) are two teenage human boys from Richwood High.

Mr. Kreese
Mr. Kreese (voiced by Steve Furst) is Carlton and Troy's coach. Mr Kreese acts a playground bully.

Notes

References

External links

Official website
Official Cartoon Network page for The Amazing World of Gumball
The Amazing World of Gumball character guide

Cartoon Network Studios characters
Lists of characters in American television animation
Lists of characters in British television animation
Characters
Television characters introduced in 2011